Dinner Island is an island in the San Juan Islands of the U.S. state of Washington. It lies in Griffin Bay on the southeastern coast of San Juan Island.

The name comes from the landing of a party from a British vessel who ate dinner on the island.

References

External links
 

San Juan Islands